Harvey Law Group is a multinational law firm specializing in corporate law and investment immigration. As of 2020, the firm is headquartered in Hong Kong with over 22 offices worldwide including Thailand, Vietnam, Cambodia, the Philippines, Ivory Coast, Malaysia, Indonesia, South Africa.

Harvey Law Group practices law in the areas of business immigration, business and corporate law, company incorporation, labour and employment issues, due diligence, mergers and acquisitions, tax planning and structuring, real estate, contracts and agreements, intellectual property, environmental law, and cross-border trade issues.

HLG is notable for its roster of professional immigration lawyers and immigration advisory on residency and citizenship-by-investment, or also known as 'Investment Immigration'.   The company’s stated mode of operations is to fully integrate into and work within the regional legal framework of each branch office and migration jurisdiction. The company is recognized by 16 national governments as an official partner of their CBI (Citizenship by Investment) programs.

History 
Harvey Law Group (HLG) was established in Montreal, Quebec in 1992 by Jean-François Harvey. Bastien Trelcat then joined as Managing Partner for the Asia Pacific region in 2013. Since its founding, the firm has facilitated more than USD $2 billion in cross-border transactions.

HLG received its license to practice in Vietnam in 2008.  They were the first Canadian law firm to be recognized by the Vietnamese Ministry of Justice. As of 2020 HLG maintains offices in Hanoi, Da Nang, and Ho Chi Minh City.

Services

Business Law
Advice on Mining, Forestry, Environmental Law
Commercial Leases
Cross Border Trade Issues 
Company Formation in Worldwide jurisdictions
Shareholder & Partnership Agreements
Joint Ventures & Other Strategic Alliances Contracts
Mergers & Acquisitions
Intellectual Property
Technology Protection
Property Ownership Structures
Real Estate Issues

Immigration
Businessmen, VIPs, and Dependent Programs
Foreign Exchange Law 
Estate Planning
Citizenship by Investment
Real Estate Investment
 Residency by Investment
Residency planning

Private Clients Services 
Tax Planning & Restructuring
Wealth Preservation, Wills, Inheritance Advice
Verification of Identity and Notarisation

Publications and Accreditations
The Law Review - Corporate Immigration Review: Thailand Chapter 2018 
Jean-Francois Harvey on Bloomberg TV Philippines 
The Law Review - Corporate Immigration Review: Myanmar Chapter 2017-19
The International Comparative Legal Guide to Corporate Immigration 2016: Chapter 5 a Myth or a Reality?
The International Comparative Legal Guide to Corporate Immigration 2016: Chapter 19 Myanmar
Common Reporting Standard: Are we finally seeing the end of tax evasion? 
The International Comparative Legal Guide to Corporate Immigration 2016: Chapter 26 Thailand

Criticism & Controversy 
HLG acted on behalf of three ex-employees of Chinese tech giant Huawei, who were accused of espionage by Canadian authorities during their immigration applications. Jean-Francois Harvey, whose Harvey Law Group acted on behalf of the mainland Chinese trio, said the now-withdrawn accusations appeared to have been the work of a single officer in the Canadian consulate-general’s office in Hong Kong.
Harvey said an identification code on correspondence proved that the same case officer dealt with all three clients, who have settled in Canada in the past four months.
They were “definitely not” spies, said the lawyer.

References 

Law firms of Thailand
Companies of Hong Kong
Law firms established in 1992
1992 establishments in Quebec